Awarua was a New Zealand parliamentary electorate from 1881 to 1996.

Population centres
The previous electoral redistribution was undertaken in 1875 for the 1875–1876 election. In the six years since, New Zealand's European population had increased by 65%. In the 1881 electoral redistribution, the House of Representatives increased the number of European representatives to 91 (up from 84 since the 1875–76 election). The number of Māori electorates was held at four. The House further decided that electorates should not have more than one representative, which led to 22 new electorates being formed, including Awarua, and two electorates that had previously been abolished to be recreated. This necessitated a major disruption to existing boundaries.

This electorate was in the rural part of Southland. In its original form, it covered the area around the town of Invercargill, which had its own electorate. Bluff fell into Awarua, and all of Stewart Island / Rakiura.

History
The electorate was established in 1881. It was represented by the Prime Minister, Sir Joseph Ward from 1887 to 1919. Philip De La Perrelle announced his retirement due to ill health in August 1935.

In the 1996 election, the first MMP election, the electorate was absorbed into the adjacent Invercargill electorate.

Members of Parliament
Key

      

1James Hargest was originally an Independent supporter of the Reform Party. He joined the National Party in 1936.

Election results

1963 election

1944 by-election

1935 election

 
 
 
 
 
 

 

Table footnotes:

1931 election

1928 election

1925 election

1922 election

1919 election

1914 election

1911 election

1908 election

1905 election

1902 election

1899 election

1897 by-election

1896 election

1893 election

1890 election

1887 election

1884 election

Notes

References

Historical electorates of New Zealand
1881 establishments in New Zealand
1996 disestablishments in New Zealand
Politics of Southland, New Zealand